The 1998 World Youth Games was the first international multi-sport event of its kind. More than 7,500 young athletes representing 140 countries of the world participated in this event. The Games took place in Moscow, Russia from July 11 to 19, 1998.

Ceremony

The opening ceremony was held in the Luzhniki Stadium (Стадион "Лужники"). It included 32 International Olympic Committee (IOC) members, 43 National Olympic Committee (NOC) presidents, Boris Yeltsin – then current President of the Russian Federation, Yuri Luzhkov – mayor of Moscow, with the presence of 80,000 spectators. One of the most emotional moments of the ceremony was the arrival of the Olympic flame, after traveling through 13 regions of the Russian Federation. Another spectacular moment was when 2 Russian cosmonauts greeted all the spectators directly from Orbital Station Mir. The mayor of Moscow and the IOC President addressed the spectators, and Boris Yeltsin declared the World Youth Games opened.

Participants and sports
More than 7,500 young athletes under 17 years of age representing 140 countries competed in a variety of sports that included basketball, football, volleyball, handball, tennis and table tennis, track and field athletics, swimming, synchronized swimming, gymnastics and modern rhythmic gymnastics, fencing, judo and Greco-Roman wrestling.

Objective
The main objectives of the first World Youth Games were to involve the young participants in the Olympic movement and promote the Olympic spirit of friendship and mutual understanding among peoples, preparing their psychological and aptitude conditions for international starts and also selecting young talents for the participation in future Olympic Games.

Beginning from 2010, the Youth Olympic Games were to be held every four years in staggered summer and winter events complementing the Olympic Games, thus rendering the World Youth Games obsolete.

Mascot
The motto of the World Youth Games was “the open world for childhood” and its mascot was Mishka (Мишка)  – the Russian Bear that was also the mascot of the XXII Summer Olympic Games in Moscow 1980.

Initiation
On November 27, 1995, a small government delegation from Moscow visited the headquarters of the International Olympic Committee in Lausanne, Switzerland in order to rally support for the organization of a major international youth competition under IOC patronage in the Russian capital. Moscow's delegation argued that the city had a strong experience of staging sport events. The IOC granted its patronage to the “World Youth Games” and an agreement was signed in April 1997 between the IOC, the city of Moscow and the Russian Olympic Committee, setting out the event.

Nations

Infrastructure
After the agreement was signed, Moscow started its infrastructure preparations. It undertook 2 major projects. The first was the renovation of the Luzhniki Sports Arena, which was completed in September, 1997 at Moscow's 850th anniversary. The stadium was built in 1955, and in 1980 it became the heart of the XXII Summer Olympic Games. The other major project was the construction of the Olympic village. This contraction was placed under the control of the city administration and it was based on the plan of the 1980 Olympic Village. The Village constituted of five 19-to-25 story buildings, a complex-sport gymnasium, a cycling track and a massive cafeteria. In addition, its landscape included artificial hills and a lake. Later, this complex-building became one of the most prestigious residential areas in the city.

See also
Youth Olympic Games

References

 
World Youth Games, 1998
Sports competitions in Moscow
W
International sports competitions hosted by Russia
1998 in Moscow
Multi-sport events in Russia
World Youth Games
July 1998 sports events in Russia